The Northern Territory Minister for Health is a Minister of the Crown in the Government of the Northern Territory of Australia. The minister administers their portfolio through the Department of Health.

The Minister is responsible for adult guardianship, alcohol and other drug services, alcohol management plans, alcohol policy, alcohol treatment and rehabilitation, community service complaints, food standards, health (including hospital and medical services), health complaints, human quarantine, mental health services, morgues, National Disability Insurance Scheme (NDIS) implementation, services to the aged, services to the disabled, sexual assault services, university medical education and research and water quality. They are also responsible for the Menzies School of Health Research, the Health and Community Services Complaints Commission and the Public Guardian.

The current minister is Natasha Fyles (Labor). She was sworn in on 12 September 2016 following the Labor victory at the 2016 election.

List of Ministers for Health

Alcohol Policy

Disability Services

Former posts

Alcohol Rehabilitation

Mental Health Services

References

Northern Territory-related lists
Ministers of the Northern Territory government
Health in the Northern Territory